The West Texas Walk of Fame honors those individuals who have an affiliation to Lubbock and the West Texas area and have devoted much of their lives to the development of and/or gained recognition in the promotion or production of the arts, music and entertainment.

Formation
The concept of a Walk of Fame for West Texas began as an idea between Waylon Jennings, Larry Corbin and Jerry Coleman as a way to recognize the Lubbock born Buddy Holly.  This idea quickly grew into a way of honoring the numerous artists and musicians that came from West Texas.  In 1979, Buddy Holly was the first inductee into the Walk of Fame, during which a concert took place to raise money for a statue and plaque in his honor.  The following year, Waylon Jennings who prompted the initial idea, was himself inducted as the second member of the West Texas Walk of Fame.

Continuation
In 1983, Lubbock non-profit group, Civic Lubbock, Inc. was asked to administer the Walk of Fame and have annually nominated and inducted many West Texas artists. In 2011, the City of Lubbock moved the West Texas Walk of Fame to its new home at the Buddy and Maria Elena Holly Plaza located at 19th Street and Crickets Avenue.  The plaza houses the original Buddy Holly statue and the bronze plaques for every inductee.

Inductees
Inductees are nominated by the Walk of Fame Committee portion of Civic Lubbock, Inc. These nominations are submitted to the Civic Lubbock, Inc. Board and voted on for approval.  The following lists The Walk of Fame inductees and the year of their induction.

References

Walks of fame
Tourist attractions in Lubbock, Texas
Halls of fame in Texas